Ben Starr is an English actor, known for his acting roles in Survivor, Dickensian and Quantum Break.

Biography
Starr was born in Bristol. He attended Queen Elizabeth's Hospital School and was Captain of School 2005/6. While at school he was a member of Great Western Youth Theatre, Bristol Old Vic Youth Theatre and HTV Television Workshop. He studied History at the University of Durham and was President of Castle Theatre Company, a member of DULOG and a founding member of DIM. On graduating from Durham he completed a 2 year postgraduate acting course at the London Academy of Music and Dramatic Art (LAMDA).

Career
His first role was in Father Brown in 2013, followed by Doctors in 2013, and The Musketeers in 2015. He played Captain James Hawdon in the BBC series Dickensian. In 2016 he had roles in Casualty as Nathan Mason and he starred in the role of Donatello in Medici: Masters of Florence. In 2017 he landed a recurring role as the Apothecary, Dr Christopher Priestley, in the Sky1 series Jamestown.

Filmography

Film

Television

Theatre

Video Games

References

British male actors
Living people
Male actors from Bristol
Alumni of the London Academy of Music and Dramatic Art
Year of birth missing (living people)
Alumni of University College, Durham